The 2010 NRW Trophy was held in two parts, with ice dancers competing separately from the singles disciplines and pair skating. Both competitions were held at the Eissportzentrum Westfalenhalle in Dortmund. The ice dancing competition was held between November 5 and 7, 2010, and the other disciplines between December 2 and 5, 2010. Skaters competed in the disciplines of men's singles, ladies' singles, pair skating, and ice dancing across the levels of senior, junior, and novice. In addition, the ice dancing competition includes a pre-novice division.

Senior results

Men

 WD = Withdrawn

Ladies

 WD = Withdrawn

Pairs

Ice dancing

 WD = Withdrawn

Junior results

Ice dancing

+ 19 other couples.

Ice dancing (Basic junior)
 Pattern dance 1: Viennese Waltz
 Pattern dance 2: Silver Samba

Novice results

Ice dancing (Advanced novice)
 Pattern dance 1: Starlight Waltz 
 Pattern dance 2: Tango

Ice dancing (Basic novice)
 Pattern dance 1: Fourteenstep
 Pattern dance 2: European Waltz

External links
 Singles and pairs results
 Ice dance results

2010
2010 in figure skating